Dave Burgess (born December 13, 1934, Beverly Hills, California, United States) is an American guitar player, singer, songwriter, and band leader of The Champs.

Biography

Singing career 
In 1953, he recorded for Okeh, as a singer and made his first records with no success. His first release was "Judalina" b/w "Don't Put A Dent In My Heart" (Okeh 4-7002).  A second release was "Gratefully Yours" b/w "Too Late For Tears" (Okeh 4-7044).   He subsequently recorded for different record labels, with many of his vocals appearing on the budget TOPS label. In 1957, he recorded for Challenge as Dave Duprè. He finally found initial success as a songwriter with many songs including the 1957 hit I'm Available for Margie Rayburn. Dave also recorded his own version of "I'm Available" for Challenge (Challenge 1008).

The Champs 
On December 23, 1957, while working with other session musicians, they started a jam session which resulted in the composition of "Tequila". This was when the band officially formed, with Burgess on rhythm guitar.

Full-time manager 
In late 1960, since Glen Campbell came in as the new rhythm guitarist for the band, Burgess left, but was still the band's manager. In 1965, the Champs disbanded. He composed many of their songs, while he was still manager.

References

External links
 

Living people
1934 births
Musicians from Beverly Hills, California
20th-century American guitarists
Guitarists from California